Tracey Roberts may refer to:

Tracey Roberts (actress) (1914–2002), American film and TV supporting performer
Tracey Roberts (politician), Western Australian political figure since 2003, City of Wanneroo mayor